This is the discography of American rapper Ill Bill.

Albums

Studio albums

Group/collaborative studio albums

Demos

Compilations

Mixtapes

Extended plays

Instrumental albums

Singles

Guest appearances

Production credits

Music Videos

References

Hip hop discographies
Discographies of American artists